The 2008 Wimbledon Championships was a tennis tournament played on grass courts at the All England Lawn Tennis and Croquet Club in Wimbledon, London in the United Kingdom. It was the 122nd edition of the Wimbledon Championships and were held from 23 June to 6 July 2008. It was the third Grand Slam tennis event of the year.

Spanish player Rafael Nadal won the first Wimbledon title of his career; the first Grand Slam tournament he had won other than the French Open. Nadal defeated five-time defending champion Roger Federer in the final in what many regard as the greatest tennis match of all time. In the women's singles, Venus Williams claimed her fifth title, and first win over her sister Serena in a Wimbledon final (she had lost the previous two). The performances of Britons Andy Murray in the men's singles and Laura Robson in the girls' singles were able to arouse significant interest from the home crowd.

Following the completion of the 2007 Championships, the new fixed roof was put in place at Centre Court, in time for the 2008 Championships. The retractable section of the new roof was completed for the 2009 Championships.

Point and prize money distribution

Point distribution
Below are the tables with the point distribution for each discipline of the tournament.

Senior points

Prize distribution
The total prize money for 2008 championships was £11,812,000. The winner of the men's and women's singles title earned £750,000.

* per team

Champions

Seniors

Men's singles

 Rafael Nadal def.  Roger Federer, 6–4, 6–4, 6–7(5–7), 6–7(8–10), 9–7 
 It was Rafael Nadal's sixth title of the year, and his 29th overall. It was his second Grand Slam title of the year, his fifth overall, and his first Wimbledon title.

Women's singles

 Venus Williams def.  Serena Williams, 7–5, 6–4 
 It was Venus Williams's first title of the year, and her 37th overall. It was her seventh Grand Slam title, her fifth Wimbledon win, and her second consecutive win at the event.

Men's doubles

 Daniel Nestor /  Nenad Zimonjić def.  Jonas Björkman /  Kevin Ullyett, 7–6(14–12), 6–7(3–7), 6–3, 6–3

Women's doubles

 Serena Williams /  Venus Williams def.  Lisa Raymond /  Samantha Stosur, 6–2, 6–2

Mixed doubles

 Bob Bryan /  Samantha Stosur def.  Mike Bryan /  Katarina Srebotnik, 7–5, 6–4

Juniors

Boys' singles

 Grigor Dimitrov def.  Henri Kontinen, 7–5, 6–3

Girls' singles

 Laura Robson def.  Noppawan Lertcheewakarn, 6–3, 3–6, 6–1

Boys' doubles

 Hsieh Cheng-peng /  Yang Tsung-hua def.  Matt Reid /  Bernard Tomic, 6–4, 2–6, 12–10

Girls' doubles

 Polona Hercog /  Jessica Moore def.  Isabella Holland /  Sally Peers, 6–3, 1–6, 6–2

Other events

Gentlemen's invitation doubles

 Donald Johnson /  Jared Palmer def.  Jacco Eltingh /  Paul Haarhuis, walkover

Ladies' invitation doubles

 Jana Novotná /  Kathy Rinaldi def.  Martina Navratilova /  Helena Suková, 5–7, 6–3, [10–5]

Senior gentlemen's invitation doubles

 Ken Flach /  Robert Seguso def.  Jeremy Bates /  Anders Järryd, 7–6(7–1), 6–7(5–7), [10–7]

Wheelchair men's doubles

 Robin Ammerlaan /  Ronald Vink def.  Stéphane Houdet /  Nicolas Peifer, 6–7(8–10), 6–1, 6–3

Notable stories

Betting scandal
There were allegations in a dossier that several matches, including eight at Wimbledon, were under suspicion of being fixed by professional gambling syndicates after bookmakers noted unexpected spikes in betting patterns. The dossier, released on the Sunday prior to the first day of play, had been commissioned by the Association of Tennis Professionals (ATP), Women's Tennis Association (WTA), International Tennis Federation (ITF), and four Grand Slams earlier in the year, and was compiled by bookmakers. An official said, "If you look at a tournament, you might see one match for £23,000 [in betting turnover], one for £27,000, one for £36,000 and one for £4.5m. It doesn’t take a genius to work out that something is going on in the last one." Betting on Wimbledon matches was popular in 2007, with over £420m wagered on bets.

To help deal with any potential gambling problems, the All England Club restricted access to player's changing rooms this year, allowing only the player and their coach permission. It was hoped that this would make communication between gamblers and players more difficult. Match fixing became a prominent issue in the media after the 2007 Orange Prokom Open, where the then World No. 4 Nikolay Davydenko came under suspicion of colluding with gamblers, and gambling company Betfair took the unprecedented step of voiding all bets on a match of his with Martín Vassallo Argüello.

Pigeon killing controversy
The All England Lawn Tennis and Croquet Club, the sport club that plays host to the Championships, came under fire from animal activists for using marksmen to shoot down dive-bombing pigeons. The marksmen were ordered to use hawks to scare them away, but when some failed to do so, the marksmen killed them, which led to the People for the Ethical Treatment of Animals (PETA) group releasing a statement admonishing the practice and subsequently, referring to the Animal Welfare Act 2006, contacting the Metropolitan Police.

Several players complained about the pigeons distracting them during play, and because of the inefficient nature of the hawks, rapid action was sought on the Sunday evening before the tournament began. The marksmen were hired by the All England Club and, armed with rifles, shot several birds. When the media broke the story on Monday, a spokesman for the All England Club defended the club's approach, saying that, "The hawks are our first line of deterrent, and by and large they do the job. But unfortunately there were one or two areas where the hawks didn't deter the pigeons, so it was deemed necessary to take a harder approach." By Tuesday however, the Metropolitan Police wildlife crime unit had been alerted to the practice by PETA, after allegedly infringing the Animal Welfare Act 2006. Bruce Friedrich, vice-president of PETA, wrote in a letter to the All England Club chairman Tim Phillips, that the birds did not represent "a demonstrable risk to public health and safety", and the activity was therefore in violation of the Act. A Wimbledon spokesperson subsequently announced that they had reneged on their policy, and that the All England Club would no longer shoot pigeons.

A similar, but more inconspicuous, incident also occurred on the Sunday evening before the Championships. A swarm of bees descended upon the area surrounding the All England Club; this caused the clearing out of the players' lawn (where competitors gather after play) and a temporary cessation of some interviews. Further disruption was caused because organizers had to alter the overnight queuing system, in order to protect people. This was the first time that bees had caused disruptions at the All England Club. Some media outlets reported that the bees deserted the grounds after around 90 minutes, whilst others claimed that a similar resolution to the pigeon problem was sought, with the bees being professionally exterminated.

British performance
The British public were treated to some palpable success, as London-based Laura Robson became the first British girl to win the Girls' juniors competition since Annabel Croft in 1984. Fourteen-year-old Robson, the youngest player in the Girls' juniors, had to beat players aged up to eighteen, the maximum age allowed for entry into the juniors. She garnered considerable media attention; with a large crowd gathered to watch both her semi-final and final matches, the latter of which was on No. 1 Court, she called it an "overwhelming experience." British-based gambling company Ladbrokes slashed her odds of winning Wimbledon before 2020 from 50/1 to 20/1.

In the seniors, 2007 mixed doubles champion Jamie Murray could not replicate his triumph of the previous year with new partner Liezel Huber, after his 2007 partner Jelena Janković opted not to play in order to concentrate on the singles competition. Murray and Huber reached the semi-finals where they were knocked out by Bob Bryan and Samantha Stosur.

In the seniors singles competition, the most significant impact was made by Scottish player Andy Murray, when he became the first British player to reach the quarter-finals since Tim Henman in 2004. Murray, often castigated in the British media for his surly manner, won the crowd's affections with his five-set victory over Richard Gasquet (details of this match are given in the Day 7 summary). The Murray–Gasquet match was watched by over 10 million people in the UK, and it was watched by more than 50% of the potential viewing public in his native Scotland.

Chris Eaton from Surrey, the ATP No. 661, successfully began his campaign in qualifying, and then caused a major surprise by beating ATP No. 114 Boris Pašanski in the first round. Anne Keothavong was the first British woman to directly qualify to the main draw since 1998, however no British woman made it beyond the second round.

A tournament of upsets and surprises

The men's side of the draw was notable for the performances of Marat Safin and Rainer Schüttler, ranked 75th and 94th respectively on entering the tournament. Safin caused an upset in the second round when he defeated Australian Open champion Novak Djokovic in straight sets, on the way to his first ever Wimbledon semi-final, where he lost to Roger Federer. After more than five years without reaching the quarter-finals of a Grand Slam tournament, and thirteen consecutive Grand Slam tournaments without advancing past the second round, Schüttler also reached his first Wimbledon semi-final, where he was defeated in straight sets by the eventual champion Rafael Nadal. Schüttler had earlier defeated Arnaud Clément (who had previously not advanced to the quarter-finals of a Grand Slam tournament since reaching the final of the 2001 Australian Open) in an epic quarter-final that lasted two days.

The women's side of the draw saw some of the biggest upsets in the tournament's history, in which the top four seeds—Ana Ivanovic, Jelena Janković, Maria Sharapova and Svetlana Kuznetsova—all failed to reach the quarter-finals. Maria Sharapova suffered her earliest exit at Wimbledon when she lost to Alla Kudryavtseva in the second round; this was also her earliest exit at a Grand Slam since the 2003 US Open. Recent French Open champion and newly crowned World No. 1 Ana Ivanovic was stunned in the third round by Chinese wild card entrant and World No. 133 Zheng Jie. This was the earliest exit by a top seed at Wimbledon since Martina Hingis lost in the first round in 2001, and Zheng Jie also became the lowest-ranked player ever to defeat a top seed at the tournament. Janković and Kuznetsova were both toppled in the fourth round by Tamarine Tanasugarn and Agnieszka Radwańska, respectively. This was the first time since seedings began at Wimbledon in 1927 (and the first time in the Open Era) that none of the top four seeds managed to advance past the fourth round. Zheng Jie became the second Chinese player (after Li Na in 2006) to reach the quarter-finals at Wimbledon, and the first wild card entry ever to reach the semi-finals (a feat later achieved by Sabine Lisicki in 2011), where she was defeated by eventual runner-up Serena Williams. Meanwhile, Tanasugarn reached her first Grand Slam quarter-final by virtue of her victory over Janković, losing to the eventual champion Venus Williams.

Singles players
Men's singles

Women's singles

Day by day

Singles seeds
The following are the seeded players and notable players who withdrew from the event. Seedings based on ATP and WTA rankings as of 16 June 2008. Rankings and points before are as of 23 June 2008.

Men's singles

The Men's singles seeds is arranged on a surface-based system to reflect more accurately the individual player's grass court achievement as per the following formula:
ESP points as at a week before The Championships at 16 June 2008
Add 100% points earned for all grass court tournaments in the past 12 months (18 June 2007 – 15 June 2008)
add 75% points earned for best grass court tournament in the 12 months before that (19 June 2006 – 17 June 2007).

The following players would have been seeded, but they withdrew from the event.

Women's singles

† The player did not qualify for the tournament in 2007. Accordingly, points for her 16th best result are deducted instead.

The following player would have been seeded, but she withdrew from the event.

Main draw wild card entries
The following players received wild cards into the main draw senior events.

Men's singles
  Jamie Baker
  Alex Bogdanovic
  Jérémy Chardy
  Xavier Malisse

Women's singles
  Elena Baltacha
  Naomi Cavaday
  Katie O'Brien
  Urszula Radwańska
  Melanie South
  Carla Suárez Navarro
  Samantha Stosur
  Zheng Jie

Men's doubles
  James Auckland /  Jamie Delgado
  Neil Bamford /  Josh Goodall
  Richard Bloomfield /  Ken Skupski
  Alex Bogdanovic /  Jonathan Marray
  Chris Eaton /  Alexander Slabinsky

Women's doubles
  Elena Baltacha /  Naomi Cavaday
  Amanda Elliott /  Katie O'Brien
  Anne Keothavong /  Melanie South
  Anna Fitzpatrick /  Anna Hawkins
  Sarah Borwell /  Jocelyn Rae

Mixed doubles
  James Auckland /  Elena Baltacha
  Alex Bogdanovic /  Melanie South
  Richard Bloomfield /  Sarah Borwell
  Jamie Delgado /  Katie O'Brien
  Ross Hutchins /  Anne Keothavong

Main draw qualifier entries

Men's singles

Men's singles qualifiers
  Andreas Beck 
  Christophe Rochus
  Frederico Gil
  Philipp Petzschner
  Kevin Kim
  Édouard Roger-Vasselin
  Izak van der Merwe
  Jesse Levine
  Pavel Šnobel
  Stefano Galvani
  Alexander Peya 
  Jan Hernych 
  Sergiy Stakhovsky
  Simon Stadler
  Chris Eaton
  Dawid Olejniczak

Lucky losers
  Ilija Bozoljac
  Tobias Kamke

Women's singles

Women's singles qualifiers
  Anastasia Pavlyuchenkova
  Zuzana Ondrášková 
  Barbora Záhlavová-Strýcová
  Séverine Brémond 
  María José Martínez Sánchez
  Viktoriya Kutuzova 
  Maria Elena Camerin
  Stéphanie Foretz 
  Magdaléna Rybáriková
  Rika Fujiwara 
  Eva Hrdinová 
  Mathilde Johansson

Men's doubles

Men's doubles qualifiers
  Amer Delić /  Brendan Evans
  Frederico Gil /  Dick Norman
  K. J. Hippensteel /  Tripp Phillips
  Petr Pála /  Igor Zelenay

Lucky losers
  Johan Brunström /  Adam Feeney
  Mikhail Elgin /  Alexander Kudryavtsev
  Hugo Armando /  Jesse Levine

Women's doubles

Women's doubles qualifiers
  Maria Kirilenko /  Flavia Pennetta
  Raquel Kops-Jones /  Abigail Spears
  Jorgelina Cravero /  Betina Jozami
  Andrea Hlaváčková /  Olga Savchuk

Lucky losers
  Christina Fusano /  Angela Haynes
  Ayumi Morita /  Junri Namigata
  Anna Smith /  Georgie Stoop

Withdrawals 
The following players were accepted directly into the main tournament, but withdrew with injuries, suspensions or personal reasons.

Men's Singles
 José Acasuso → replaced by  Tobias Kamke
 Juan Ignacio Chela → replaced by  Brian Dabul
 Stefan Koubek → replaced by  Alejandro Falla
 Florian Mayer → replaced by  Boris Pašanski
 Juan Mónaco → replaced by  Roko Karanušić
 Gaël Monfils → replaced by  Ilija Bozoljac
 Carlos Moyá → replaced by  Martín Vassallo Argüello
 Jo-Wilfried Tsonga → replaced by  Wayne Odesnik

Women's Singles
  Eleni Daniilidou → replaced by  Aleksandra Wozniak
  Tatiana Golovin → replaced by  Milagros Sequera
  Karin Knapp → replaced by  Monica Niculescu
  Akiko Morigami → replaced by  Renata Voráčová
  María Emilia Salerni → replaced by  Julia Görges
  Meghann Shaughnessy → replaced by  Bethanie Mattek
  Meilen Tu → replaced by  Vania King

References

External links

 Official Wimbledon Championships website